In the 2014–15 football season, English club Newcastle United competed in the Premier League for the fifth consecutive season. It was Newcastle United's 122nd season of professional football.

The season saw Newcastle end in 15th place after a difficult season for the Magpies. Newcastle started the season without a win from their opening eight games, and ended it by only winning three times in 19 Premier League games. Manager Alan Pardew was subject to protests during the opening run, but seemed to have turned a corner by following it with six consecutive wins, including a Capital One Cup victory at Manchester City. Pardew left Newcastle in January to join Crystal Palace, with manager John Carver taking over until the end of the season. He presided over some of Newcastle's worst ever league form, including a run of eight consecutive defeats. A win over West Ham on the final day of the season ultimately secured Newcastle survival. Newcastle United season reviews

This article shows statistics and lists details of all matches played by the club during the season.

Chronological list of events

6 June 2014: 20-year-old Ayoze Pérez signs for the Magpies for an estimated fee of £1.6m from Tenerife.

9 June 2014: Jack Colback from Sunderland joins the Magpies on a free transfer.

11 June 2014: Stefan Broccoli, Michael Newberry, Lewis Suddick, Ben Pollock, Luke Charman, Jamie Holmes, Jack Hunter, Louis Johnson, Sean Longstaff, Ben Smith, Jake Trodd and Dan Ward sign scholarships with the club's academy. James Morgan, Lewis Aird and Macauley Booth leave the academy.

18 June 2014: The 2014–15 Premier League fixtures are released with the Magpies kicking off against reigning champions Manchester City for a second season running.

28 June 2014: James Tavernier signs for Championship side Wigan Athletic for an expected fee of £400K.

1 July 2014: Romain Amalfitano leaves on a free transfer for Dijon.

2 July 2014: Siem de Jong signs from Ajax for an expected fee of £7.5 million.

4 July 2014: The club appoints Dave Billows as Head of Fitness.

13 July 2014: Rémy Cabella signs from Montpellier for an expected fee of £8 million.

16 July 2014: Emmanuel Rivière signs from Monaco for an expected fee of £6.3 million.

17 July 2014: Mathieu Debuchy is transferred to Arsenal for an expected fee of £12 million.

17 July 2014: Daryl Janmaat signs from Feyenoord for an expected fee of £5 million.

22 July 2014: Sylvain Marveaux joins Guingamp on a season-long loan.

3 August 2014: Facundo Ferreyra signs from Shakhtar Donetsk on a season-long loan.

9 August 2014: Newcastle completes double signing of Karl Darlow and Jamaal Lascelles from Nottingham Forest for an expected combined fee of £7 million. Both are immediately loaned back to the selling club for the rest of the season.

30 August 2014: The Magpies score their first goals of the season in a 3–3 draw with Crystal Palace, including debut Newcastle goals for defender Mike Williamson and 18-year-old Rolando Aarons.

1 September 2014: Mapou Yanga-Mbiwa joins Roma on a season-long loan.

2 September 2014: Hatem Ben Arfa joins Hull City on a season-long loan.

18 October 2014: Newcastle gain their first league win of the season, with Gabriel Obertan scoring the only goal in a 1–0 win over Leicester City.

29 October 2014: A first away victory over Manchester City in 14 years saw Newcastle reach the quarter-finals of the League Cup for the first time since 2007.

9 November 2014: The Magpies record their fifth consecutive win in all competitions with a 2–0 away win against West Bromwich Albion to return to the top half of the Premier League table.

6 December 2014: Despite having Steven Taylor sent off, Newcastle record a third consecutive home win over Chelsea to bring the League leaders' 23-match unbeaten run in all competitions to an end.

13 December 2014: In Jak Alnwick's first start at the Emirates Stadium against Arsenal they lost 4–1 and Santi Cazorla scored a penalty past Alnwick.

17 December 2014: In the fifth round, Newcastle were eliminated from the League Cup by Tottenham Hotspur, 4–0.

21 December 2014: Newcastle lose their fourth consecutive Tyne-Wear derby for the first time in the club's history, losing by a goal to nil thanks to a 90th-minute goal by Adam Johnson. Cheick Tioté also picked up a fifth yellow card, meaning he will miss the Boxing Day fixture against Manchester United.

28 December 2014: The Magpies win their last match of 2014, winning 3–2 against Everton, with former Sunderland midfielder Jack Colback scoring his first League goal in a Newcastle shirt.

29 December 2014: Newcastle United manager Alan Pardew is given permission to speak to Crystal Palace regarding their vacant managerial role. Assistant manager John Carver is put in temporary charge of the side.

1 January 2015: In John Carver's first game as caretaker manager, they drew 3–3 against Burnley and Alan Pardew was on the stands at Villa Park to see Crystal Palace play against Aston Villa where it ended 0–0.

2 January 2015: Alan Pardew is appointed as Crystal Palace manager.

3 January 2015: In the Magpies' first match of the FA Cup third round, they were eliminated by Leicester City, 1–0.

4 January 2015: Newcastle United announce that Hatem Ben Arfa's contract has been terminated with mutual consent, with French Ligue 1 side Nice announcing the arrival of the player.

26 January 2015: John Carver is appointed as head coach until the end of 2014–15 season.

2 February 2015: On transfer deadline day, Davide Santon joined Internazionale on loan and Haris Vučkić, Remie Streete, Gaël Bigirimana, Shane Ferguson and Kevin Mbabu joined Rangers on loan.

9 February 2015: Eighteen-year-old midfielder Daniel Barlaser, capped by Turkey at Under–17 level, signs his first professional contract, committing himself to Newcastle United on a long-term deal of unspecified length.

4 March 2015: In the Magpies' 1–0 loss against Manchester United, Papiss Cissé was suspended seven matches for spitting at Jonny Evans, while he was suspended for six matches. But one of Cissé's suspension is for arm butting Séamus Coleman in a 3–2 win against Everton on 28 December 2014.

27 March 2015: Ten youth players are offered scholarships at Newcastle United effective from 1 July 2015. They are Yannick Aziakonou, Owen Bailey, Shane Donaghey, Owen Gallacher, Nathan Harker, Mackenzie Heaney, Dan Lowther, Lewis McNall, Callum Smith and Craig Spooner. Meanwhile, academy players Macaulay Gillesphey, Tom Heardman, Liam Smith and Jamie Sterry all signed professional contracts at the club, Kyle Cameron, Jamie Cobain, Liam Gibson, Adam Laidler, Brendan Pearson and Callum Williams are all retained as third year scholars and James Atkinson, Ben Drennan, Andy Hall, Joe Kerridge, Ryan McKinnon, Greg Olley, Jonathyn Quinn and Jordan Storey are all released.

29 May 2015: Sammy Ameobi is offered a new contract by Newcastle United, but Jak Alnwick, Adam Campbell, Jonás Gutiérrez, Remie Streete and Ryan Taylor are all released. Facundo Ferreyra returns to Skakhtar Donetsk after his season-long loan deal expired.

Club

Coaching staff

Statistics

Appearances and goals
Last updated on 24 May 2015.

|-
! colspan=14 style=background:#dcdcdc; text-align:center| Goalkeepers

|-
! colspan=14 style=background:#dcdcdc; text-align:center| Defenders

|-
! colspan=14 style=background:#dcdcdc; text-align:center| Midfielders

|-
! colspan=14 style=background:#dcdcdc; text-align:center| Forwards

|-ENG
|colspan="14"|Players currently out on loan:

Goals
Last updated on 24 May 2015.

Cards
Accounts for all competitions. Last updated on 24 May 2015.

Captains
Accounts for all competitions. Last updated on 24 May 2015.

Players

First team squad

Reserve team
The following players made most of their appearances for the reserve team this season, but may have also appeared for the under-18s.

Under-18 team
The following players made most of their appearances for the under-18 team this season, but may have also appeared for the reserves.

Player movements

Transfers in

 Total spending:  ~ £35.4M

Transfers out

 Total income:  ~ £17.2M

Loans in

Loans out

Pre-season and friendlies

2014 Football United Tour

2014 Schalke 04 Cup

Competitions

Overall

Premier League

League table

Results by matchday

Matches
The fixtures for the 2014–15 season were announced on 18 June 2014 at 9am.

FA Cup

League Cup

References 

Newcastle United
Newcastle United F.C. seasons